Oligohalinophila is a genus of freshwater snails with opercula, aquatic gastropod mollusks in the subfamily Anentominae of the family Nassariidae, a family, almost all of the rest of which are marine.

Species
 Oligohalinophila dorri (Wattebled, 1886)

References

External links
 
 Neiber M.T. & Glaubrecht M. (2019). Oligohalinophila, a new genus for the brackish water assassin snail Canidia dorri Wattebled, 1886 from Vietnam (Buccinoidea: Nassariidae: Anentominae). Journal of Molluscan Studies. 85(2): 280-283

Nassariidae
Gastropod genera